The seventh season of India's Got Talent premiered on 30 April 2016. Bharti Singh and Sidharth Shukla returned to present the show. Malaika Arora Khan and Karan Johar returned for their fourth season, while Kirron Kher returned for her seventh season. The show is presented by Maruti Suzuki and powered by L'Oréal Paris once again. The show was broadcast every weekend, Saturday-Sunday at 9 pm (IST) and had its Grand Finale on July 9, 2016; with Suleiman being declared as the season's winner.

Season Overview

Golden Buzzer Summary

Semi Finals Summary 

  Buzzed |  Judges' Vote | 
  |

Semi Final 1 (25 June)

Semi Final 2 (26 June)

Semi Final 3 - Golden Buzzers (2 July)

Grand Finale (9 July)

References

Indian television series
Got Talent
2016 Indian television seasons